Sylvia Sutherland is a retired Canadian politician who was mayor of Peterborough from 1986 to 1991 and from 1998 to 2006.

Sutherland has a diploma in journalism from the Ryerson Institute of Technology, a BA (Hons) in history from Trent University, and a Post Graduate Certificate in Education from the University of Reading.

She ran as the Liberal candidate against Progressive Conservative MP Bill Domm in the federal election of 1980, losing by 2,215 votes.  Sutherland was also a Liberal candidate for Member of Provincial Parliament in the 1995 provincial election. She lost to Progressive Conservative candidate Gary Stewart.

In March 2007, she was appointed to the Ontario Municipal Board for a 5-year term.

On April 5, 2010, Sutherland hit a passenger van, killing the female passenger, Min-Hua Shao. Sutherland was convicted on August 10, 2010, of driving through a stop sign. Sutherland was fined $500, and donated $500 to a charity selected by the victim's family.

Electoral record

References

Alumni of the University of Reading
Women mayors of places in Ontario
Candidates in the 1980 Canadian federal election
Mayors of Peterborough, Ontario
Ontario Liberal Party candidates in Ontario provincial elections
Toronto Metropolitan University alumni
Trent University alumni
Living people
Year of birth missing (living people)
20th-century Canadian women politicians
Liberal Party of Canada candidates for the Canadian House of Commons